McIlroy Peak is a peak rising to  west of Husvik Harbour and  south of Mount Barren, South Georgia. It was named by the UK Antarctic Place-Names Committee in 1990 after Dr. James A. McIlroy, surgeon on the British Imperial Trans-Antarctic Expedition, 1914–16, in the Endurance, and on the Shackleton–Rowett Expedition, 1921–22, in the Quest.

References

Mountains and hills of South Georgia